KSVN-CD (channel 25) is a low-power television station licensed to Ogden, Utah, United States, serving Salt Lake City as an affiliate of Estrella TV. Founded on March 28, 1995, the station is owned by the Azteca Broadcasting Corporation, a company unrelated to the Azteca Stations Group or Azteca International Corporation, the parent company of Azteca America. Unlike many low-powered stations, it is seen on Channel 98 through Comcast cable in the Salt Lake City area in addition to its low powered signal.

History 
 The station began with an original construction permit issued to Rolando Collantes on March 28, 1995, to build a low-power station on UHF channel 21 to serve the Ogden, Utah, area. K21ET was licensed on March 1, 1996, with programming mostly from the Univision network. A month later, the station took the call letters KSVN-LP; Collantes also owned KSVN radio (730 AM). In 1999, Collantes formed a new company, Azteca Broadcasting Corporation, and moved the station's license under the new entity. In September 2000, facing displacement from channel 21, the station moved to channel 49 and in December 2000, upgraded to a Class A license. They changed their call letters to KSVN-CA a month later. In July 2002, the station dropped Univision and joined Azteca America.

On October 16, 1995, Collantes was issued a construction permit to build a low-power translator station on UHF channel 66 to serve Salt Lake City. The station, given callsign K66FN, was also licensed on March 1, 1996. Like KSVN-CA, K66FN served as a Univision affiliate until switching to Azteca America in 2002. In July 2006, the station applied for permission to move to UHF channel 39. As of January 19, 2010, K66FN is off air on channel 66 and has begun broadcasting digitally on channel 39.

On February 17, 2023, Bridge Media Networks (the parent company of 24/7 headline news service NewsNet, backed by 5-hour Energy creator Manoj Bhargava) announced it would acquire KSVN-CD for $2 million. Upon the completion of the transaction, KSVN-CD will become the second NewsNet-owned and operated station in the state of Utah.

Technical information

Subchannels
The station's digital signal is multiplexed:

June 12, 2009 was the end of the digital TV conversion period for full-service stations in the United States, and does not apply to low power stations. Therefore, KSVN-CD had been able to convert to digital broadcasts on their own schedule.
K66FN, which served the Salt Lake City area, has been replaced by a digital signal, K39JS-D (channel 39).

Programming
KSVN was the first local Spanish station that aired live Real Salt Lake regular season games.
KSVN broadcasts the only live Spanish talk show in Utah "Contacto Directo" every Thursday at 10:00 p.m., the show  has been on the air since September 2012 hosted by Carlos Macias and Lili Uriostegui.

References

External links 

TV Fool Map for KSVN

Mass media in Salt Lake City
Television channels and stations established in 1996
Spanish-language television stations in Utah
Low-power television stations in the United States
SVN-CD